Cithaeron is a genus of  araneomorph spiders in the family Cithaeronidae, first described by O. Pickard-Cambridge in 1872.

Species
 it contains seven species:
Cithaeron contentum Jocqué & Russell-Smith, 2011 – South Africa
Cithaeron delimbatus Strand, 1906 – East Africa
Cithaeron dippenaarae Bosmans & Van Keer, 2015 – Morocco
Cithaeron indicus Platnick & Gajbe, 1994 – India
Cithaeron jocqueorum Platnick, 1991 – Ivory Coast
Cithaeron praedonius O. Pickard-Cambridge, 1872 (type) – North Africa, Greece, Turkey, Middle East to India, Malaysia. Introduced to Brazil, Cuba, Australia, United States
Cithaeron reimoseri Platnick, 1991 – Eritrea, Brazil (probably introduced)

References

Araneomorphae genera
Articles created by Qbugbot
Cithaeronidae